Hrubý Šúr or Hegysúr (in , in ) is a village and municipality in western Slovakia in  Senec District in the Bratislava Region.

Geography
The municipality lies at an altitude of 128 metres and covers an area of 6.207 km2. It has a population of 647 people.

History
In historical records the village was first mentioned in 1245.
After the Austro-Hungarian army disintegrated in November 1918, Czechoslovak troops occupied the area, later acknowledged internationally by the Treaty of Trianon. Between 1938 and 1945 Hrubý Šúr once more  became part of Miklós Horthy's Hungary through the First Vienna Award. From 1945 until the Velvet Divorce, it was part of Czechoslovakia. Since then it has been part of Slovakia.

Demography
Population by nationality:

Genealogical resources

The records for genealogical research are available at the state archive "Statny Archiv in Bratislava, Slovakia"

 Roman Catholic church records (births/marriages/deaths): 1711-1898 (parish B)
 Lutheran church records (births/marriages/deaths): 1786-1896 (parish B)
 Reformated church records (births/marriages/deaths): 1784-1910 (parish B)

See also
 List of municipalities and towns in Slovakia

References

External links/Sources
https://web.archive.org/web/20071217080336/http://www.statistics.sk/mosmis/eng/run.html
Surnames of living people in Hruby Sur

Villages and municipalities in Senec District
Hungarian communities in Slovakia